Sithu Kyawhtin is a Burmese royal title used in the days of Burmese monarchy.

 Sithu Kyawhtin of Toungoo:  General of Ava Kingdom and governor of Toungoo (r. 1470–1481)
 Sithu Kyawhtin:  King of Ava (r. 1552–1555)

Burmese royal titles